James Bird may refer to:

Sports 
James Bird (rugby union) (born 1989), Welsh-born American rugby union player
James Bird (cricketer) (1808–1876), English cricketer
Doug Bird (James Douglas Bird, born 1950), baseball player

Others
James Curtis Bird (1773–1856), Canadian fur trader
James Bird (fur trader) (1798–1892), Canadian-American fur trader
J. Malcolm Bird (James Malcolm Bird, 1886–1964), American mathematician and parapsychologist
Jim Bird, Utah politician
James Bird (Illinois politician) in 5th Illinois General Assembly

See also
James Byrd (disambiguation)